The Bowmanville Eagles were a Junior "A" ice hockey team from Bowmanville, Ontario, Canada. They were a part of the Central Canadian Hockey League.  The Eagles left the OHA in 2010 when they merged with the Cobourg Cougars and left Bowmanville.

History
The team has been known as the Bowmanville Eagles since 1978. Prior to this they were known as the Bowmanville Red Eagles. The team was a member of the Central Ontario Junior C Hockey League early on. The Eagles won the Clarence Schmalz Cup as Ontario Hockey Association Junior "C" Champions in 1981. Past 1987, the Eagles enjoyed 8 straight winning seasons and 4 league championships.  After their 3rd straight league title in 1995, the Eagles under the guidance of Mike Laing, the General Manager and eventual owner during the winning years of the 1990s, made the jump to the OPJHL. The team was sold by Mike Laing mid season in 1998 to Peter Neal and Scott Mackie from Whitby, Ontario.

From 1995 until 2003, the Eagles achieved moderate results, never pushing much further than a barely winning record. Since 2003, the Eagles have put together 4 straight dominant seasons.

The Eagles were the picture of consistency over the past eight years, posting six 30+ win seasons and winning the CCHL East Division in 2010.

It is being reported that the Eagles will close its doors before the 2010–11 season.

In 2011–12, the Eagles were resurrected as the Clarington Eagles as members of the Central Ontario Junior C Hockey League.

Season-by-season results

Clarence Schmalz Cup appearances
1971: Dresden Jr. Kings defeated Bowmanville Red Eagles 4-games-to-3
1977: Essex 73's defeated Bowmanville Red Eagles 4-games-to-2
1978: Essex 73's defeated Bowmanville Red Eagles 4-games-to-1
1979: Bowmanville Eagles defeated Kincardine Kinucks 4-games-to-none
1981: Bowmanville Eagles defeated Essex 73's 4-games-to-2
1982: Flamborough Colts defeated Bowmanville Eagles 7-1 in round robin final
1995: Belle River Canadiens defeated Bowmanville Eagles 4-games-to-none

Notable alumni
 Kevin McClelland
 Adam Munro
 James Neal

References

External links
Eagles Website

Ontario Provincial Junior A Hockey League teams
Clarington
1968 establishments in Ontario
2010 disestablishments in Ontario
Ice hockey clubs established in 1968
Sports clubs disestablished in 2010